Hazara Province Movement is a movement aimed at creating the Hazara Province in the Hazara division of Khyber Pakhtunkhwa.

History of the movement 
This movement began in 1957, when regional lawyers Mufti Idrees and Abdul Khaliq first raised the question of a separate province, Kohistan. In 1987, Hazara Qaumi Mahaz (HQM) was founded by Muhammad Asif Malik advocate , a prominent advocate who campaigned for the creation of a separate province.

2010 protests 
The Eighteenth Amendment to the Constitution of Pakistan was passed on the 8th of April 2010, which among other changes, renamed the North-West Frontier Province to Khyber Pakhtunkhwa. The name change of the province was met with strong opposition from the people of Hazara and protests erupted in the region with wheel and shutter jam strikes. Abbottabad became the nerve center of the movement. On the 10th of April, the Khyber Pakhtunkhwa Police fired at unarmed protesters, leaving 7 dead and dozens injured. Allegedly, the firing was ordered by the coalition government of Khyber Pakhtunkhwa, led by the Awami National Party. This is one of the earliest incidents of police brutality in Pakistan in recent years, occurring before the Model Town Lahore incident, whose FIR has not been registered still today.

Later developments 
In 2014, the resolution for the creation of the Hazara Province was adopted by the Khyber Pakhtunkhwa Assembly. The movement slowed down and shrunk to only observing the 12th of April martyrs anniversary, the death of the movement's pioneer, Baba Haider Zaman, in 2018.

In 2020, the movement started again when the government began work for the creation of the South Punjab province. Hazara's leaders sought to include the creation of the Hazara Province along with it. A bill for the creation of the Hazara province has also been tabled in the Parliament of Pakistan.

Notable leaders 
 Baba Haider Zaman
 Gohar Ayub Khan

See also 
 Hazara, Pakistan
 Eighteenth Amendment to the Constitution of Pakistan
 2014 Lahore clash
 List of cases of law enforcement brutality in Pakistan

References 

Khyber Pakhtunkhwa
Proposed provinces and territories of Pakistan